is a former Japanese football player. He played for Japan national team.

Club career
Mochizuki was born in Shizuoka on September 18, 1953. After graduating from Tokyo University of Agriculture, he joined Japan Soccer League Division 2 club Fujitsu. The club won Division 2 champions in 1976 and was promoted to Division 1.

National team career
On July 21, 1978, Mochizuki debuted for Japan national team against Malaysia. On July 23, he also played against Singapore. He played 2 games for Japan in 1978.

National team statistics

References

External links
 
 Japan National Football Team Database

1953 births
Living people
Tokyo University of Agriculture alumni
Association football people from Shizuoka Prefecture
Japanese footballers
Japan international footballers
Japan Soccer League players
Kawasaki Frontale players
Association football defenders